Verkhnii Rohachyk Raion was one of the 18 administrative raions (a district) of Kherson Oblast in southern Ukraine. Its administrative center was located in the urban-type settlement of Verkhnii Rohachyk. The raion was abolished on 18 July 2020 as part of the administrative reform of Ukraine, which reduced the number of raions of Kherson Oblast to five. The area of Verkhnii Rohachyk Raion was merged into Kakhovka Raion. The last estimate of the raion population was 

At the time of disestablishment, the raion consisted of one hromada, Verkhnii Rohachyk settlement hromada with the administration in Verkhnii Rohachyk.

References

Former raions of Kherson Oblast
1944 establishments in Ukraine
Ukrainian raions abolished during the 2020 administrative reform